Marghdari-ye Hajji Hasan Kuh Bar (also Romanized as Marghdārī-ye Ḩājjī Ḩasan Kūh Bar) is a village in Qarah Bagh Rural District, in the Central District of Shiraz County, Fars Province, Iran. At the 2006 census, its population was 13, in 4 families.

References 

Populated places in Shiraz County